El Año del Tigre is an upcoming Peruvian-Dominican comedy film directed by Yasser Michelén and written by Jose Ramon Alama. It stars Carlos Alcántara, Wendy Ramos and Gonzalo Torres. Its premiere is scheduled for March 30, 2023, in Peruvian theaters.

Synopsis 
A restaurant is about to go bankrupt, so the owners will do everything possible to prevent it. They will go through many adventures, and they will have to face conflicts with people, between good and bad, gangsters and scammers.

Cast 
The actors participating in this film are:

 Carlos Alcántara as Sama
 Wendy Ramos
 Frank Perozo
 Gonzalo Torres
 Andrea Sofia Pimentel
 Jossi Martínez
 Salvador Perez Martinez
 Nashla Bogaert
 Luinis Olaverria
 Vicente Santos
 Ana Maria Arias

References

External links 
 

2023 films
2023 comedy films
Peruvian comedy films
Dominican Republic comedy films
2020s Spanish-language films
2020s Peruvian films
Films distributed by Disney
Films set in restaurants
Films about chefs
Films about criminals